Puruvesi is a lake in Eastern Finland. The lake is located in Kerimäki, Kesälahti and Punkaharju municipalities. Part of the Saimaa lake system, it borders on the sub-lake system of Pihlajavesi to the south. As is the case of other lakes of Saimaa, it has numerous islands and consists of numerous open lake areas, of which largest are Hummonselkä, Pajuselkä, Sammalselkä, Mustanselkä, and Ruosteselkä.

Recently,  the Saimaa Ringed Seal, a rare freshwater seal species, has returned to Puruvesi. Sightings of this  animal have occurred frequently in 2006, 2007 and 2008. At least one seal was also sighted in the winter of 2009 as having wintered and given birth in the eastern part of Puruvesi.

References

External links
 

Saimaa
Lakes of Kitee
Nature of Savonlinna